The European International School Ho Chi Minh City (EIS) is an international day school for children from 2 to 18 years of age in Ho Chi Minh City, Vietnam. The school is fully accredited by the Council of International Schools (CIS). EIS's student body is diverse, with students coming from more than 40 different countries. It is an International Baccalaureate (IB) World School.

Campus 
EIS is located in the heart of Thao Dien, Thu Duc City, Ho Chi Minh City. Its tropical garden campus occupies 13 low-rise villas with separate buildings for different functions.

Education 
EIS follows the International Baccalaureate (IB) curriculum and is an officially authorised IB World School with the Primary Years Programme (PYP), Middle Years Programme (MYP) and Diploma Programme (DP). EIS is one of only a few schools in Vietnam to offer the whole IB continuum from Toddler (2 years of age) to Grade 12.

Language of instruction 
English is the language of instruction throughout the school. However, a wide range of global language exposure is offered, such as German, French, Spanish, Korean and Vietnamese.

After-school activities 
EIS offers a diverse programme of after-school activities (currently most included in the tuition fee) for all students from Early Years to Grade 12. Students are given space and time to develop their artistic talents, social competencies, physical endurance and skills, as well as having fun in a supervised and supportive environment.

School network 
EIS belongs to the Inspired Education Group, a global education group with over 60 schools around the world.

External links 

Official website of the European International School HCMC (EIS)
Official website of Inspired

References

International schools in Ho Chi Minh City
Vietnam
Educational institutions established in 2013
2013 establishments in Vietnam
High schools in Ho Chi Minh City
Nobel Talent Schools